Ulmu is a commune in Călărași County, Muntenia, Romania. It is composed of four villages: Chirnogi, Făurei, Ulmu and Zimbru.

References

Communes in Călărași County
Localities in Muntenia